Rodimiro Barrera Estrada (born 20 March 1968) is a Mexican politician affiliated with the Institutional Revolutionary Party. He is brother of drug lord Gabino Barrera Estrada former templar knight; Gabino Barrera is wanted by the Mexican government for drug trafficking and assassinations in his hometown of Churumuco de Morelos, Michoacan.

References

1968 births
Living people
Politicians from Michoacán
Members of the Chamber of Deputies (Mexico)
Institutional Revolutionary Party politicians
21st-century Mexican politicians
Deputies of the LXII Legislature of Mexico